Carlos Velo (15 November 1909 – 10 March 1988) was a Spanish film director. He directed 45 films between 1934 and 1983. His 1956 film Torero! was nominated for an Academy Award for Best Documentary Feature.

Selected filmography
 Torero! (1956)
 Sonatas (1959)
 Pedro Páramo (1967)

References

External links

1909 births
1988 deaths
People from the Province of Ourense
Mexican film directors
Mexican film producers
Spanish film directors
Spanish film producers
Spanish screenwriters
Spanish male writers
Male screenwriters
20th-century Mexican screenwriters
20th-century Mexican male writers